Alex Tor is a conical hill,  high, located in the west of Bodmin Moor in the county of Cornwall, England.

At the summit of Alex Tor are granite rock outcrops and a large and intricate tor cairn. There are panoramic views from the summit plateau and other tors visible include: Rough Tor, Brown Willy, Showery Tor, Garrow Tor and Butter's Tor.

Parking is possible on the lane running SW to NE past the tor, but not beyond the Private Road sign. From here it is an easy climb of less than 1 kilometre.

On the western flank of the hill there are hut circles and the remains of an ancient farmstead.

References 

Hills of Cornwall
Bodmin Moor